The Field Elm cultivar  Ulmus minor 'Dijkwel' was first described in the Van't Westeinde Catalogue 27, p. 28, 1957-58.

Description
Described as resembling 'Schuurhoek' but with slightly larger, brighter leaves. Difficult to propagate from cuttings, the cultivar was noted as being free from frostcracks.

Cultivation
Production of 'Dijkwel' by the Van't Westeinde nursery (now 'Kwekerij Westhof') ceased in 1965; no living trees are known but one dead specimen still stood (2008) in the vicinity of the village of 's-Heer Abtskerke in the Zeeland province of the Netherlands.

References

Field elm cultivar
Ulmus articles missing images
Ulmus